In the French penal code, murder is defined by the intentional killing of another person. Murder is punishable by a maximum of 30 years of criminal imprisonment (no more than 20 years if the defendant is not sentenced to 30 years).
Assassination (murder with premeditation or after lying in wait for the victim) and murder in some special case (if the victim is a child under 15, the parents of the killer, people with disabilities, police officer, etc.) are punished by a jail term up to life imprisonment (no more than 30 years if the defendant is not sentenced to life).

Except for recidivists, the minimum sentence in criminal prosecutions is one or two years' imprisonment, which may be suspended if the sentence is under 5 years. Manslaughter is punishable by 15 years' imprisonment, or 20 years if aggravating circumstances exist (which are the same as those that would make a murderer eligible for life in prison).

See also
French criminal law
List of murder laws by country

References

Murder in France
France
French criminal law